Homona nakaoi is a species of moth of the family Tortricidae. It is found in Nepal, China and Vietnam.

References

Moths described in 1962
Homona (moth)